Danil Junaidi (born 15 January 1986) is an Indonesian professional footballer who plays as a right-back for and captains Liga 3 club Pekanbaru Warriors FC.

Club career

PSPS Riau
He was signed for PSPS Riau to play in Liga 2 in the 2019 season.

References

External links
 Danil Junaidi at Liga Indonesia
 Danil Junaidi at Soccerway

1986 births
Association football defenders
Living people
Indonesian footballers
Liga 1 (Indonesia) players
PSPS Pekanbaru players
Indonesian Premier Division players
Sportspeople from Riau
21st-century Indonesian people